This is the discography of Fredo, a British rapper who has released two studio albums, two mixtapes and twenty singles as a lead artist.

Studio albums

Mixtapes

Singles

As lead artist

As a featured artist

Promotional singles

Other charted and certified songs

Guest appearances

Notes

References

Hip hop discographies
Discographies of British artists